David New is a Canadian film editor.

New won a Gemini Award for "Best Editing in a Comedy, Variety or Performing Arts Program or Series" in 1997 for his work on September Songs –The Music of Kurt Weill and won the award again in 2002 for his work on Ravel’s Brain. New is a five-time Gemini Award nominee.

Awards and nominations

References

External links
 

Canadian film editors
Canadian Screen Award winners
Living people
Year of birth missing (living people)